Ri Han-Jae (李 漢宰, born 27 June 1982) is a North Korean football player for FC Machida Zelvia, captain of the J2 League team.

He played for North Korea in 2006 FIFA World Cup qualification.

Positions
Ri Han-Jae's preferred position is defensive midfielder but he can also play right wing, right midfield and occasionally right back. He used to be a central attacking midfielder. Then he transferred to FC Gifu, moving his position to defensive midfielder.

Career statistics
Updated to 23 February 2018.

1Includes Japanese Super Cup, J1/J2 playoffs and J2/J3 playoffs.

References

External links
 
 
 Profile at FC Machida Zelvia 

1982 births
Living people
Association football people from Okayama Prefecture
North Korean footballers
North Korea international footballers
J1 League players
J2 League players
J3 League players
Sanfrecce Hiroshima players
Hokkaido Consadole Sapporo players
FC Gifu players
FC Machida Zelvia players
North Korean expatriate footballers
North Korean expatriate sportspeople in Japan
Expatriate footballers in Japan
Footballers at the 2002 Asian Games
Zainichi Korean people
Association football midfielders
Asian Games competitors for North Korea